is a Japanese manga series written by Yuu Kuraishi and illustrated by Kazu Inabe. It was serialized on the manga website e Young Magazine from March 2016 to November 2018, and published in seven tankōbon volumes.

A sequel series, titled Shokuryō Jinrui Re: Starving Re:velation, started serialization on the Comic Days manga website in April 2021. As of April 2022, it has been published in four tankōbon volumes.

Publication
The series is written by Yuu Kuraishi and illustrated by Kazu Inabe. It started serialization on Kodansha's e Young Magazine manga website on March 11, 2016. The series finished serialization on November 5, 2018. The series was published in seven tankōbon volumes.

A sequel series, titled Shokuryō Jinrui Re: Starving Re:velation, started releasing on the Comic Days manga website on April 8, 2021. The sequel is also written by Yuu Kuraishi and illustrated by Kazu Inabe. As of September 2022, the sequel has been published in four tankōbon volumes.

In February 2018, Kodansha USA announced they licensed the series for English publication digitally.

Volume list

Main series

Sequel

Reception
Bernard Monasterolo from Le Monde praised the plot for its "morbid imagination", and called the art a "real success". Koiwai from Manga News also praised the first volume, calling it a "successful introduction". Erwan Lafleuriel from IGN also praised the plot, stating it was "carried out smoothly". Contrary to Monasterolo, Koiwai, and Lafleuriel's thoughts, Katherine Dacey from Manga Critic criticized the series, calling the story "efficient but artless" and stating the art "ranges from slickly generic to willfully ugly".

The series ranked tenth in the first Next Manga Award in the web manga category.

See also
 Fort of Apocalypse — Another manga series by the same authors.
 My Wife is Wagatsuma-san — Another manga series written by Yuu Kuraishi.

References

External links
 Official website 
 

2016 webcomic debuts
Dystopian anime and manga
Horror anime and manga
Kodansha manga
Science fiction anime and manga
Seinen manga
Webcomics in print